The University of St. La Salle–Integrated School (USLS-IS), located in La Salle Avenue-Montelibano Drive and in Villa Lucasan Subdivision, Brgy. Mandalagan, Bacolod, Philippines, is a Catholic primary and secondary school (Junior High) run by the De La Salle Brothers. Established in 1952 as La Salle - Bacolod, it is the second oldest campus founded by the congregation in the country.  The university is a member of De La Salle Philippines, a network established in 2006 comprising 17 Lasallian institutions in the country. It is under the supervision and administration of University of St. La Salle.

Its original campus in La Salle Avenue-Montelibano Drive houses the junior high school and grade school (collectively, the Integrated School). USLS-IS offers programs in Kinder(preschool), Angel's Center(Special Education), elementary, and junior high levels.

Integrated school curriculum

The USLS-IS is an educational institution accredited by the Philippine Association of Accrediting Schools, Colleges and Universities (PAASCU). As such, it is covered by DECS Order No. 93, s. 1992 which stipulates that accredited schools are granted "partial curricular autonomy including the authority to revise the curricula without DepEd approval provided that minimum DepEd requirements and guidelines are complied with and the revised curriculum submitted to DepED."

The school has constantly evaluated and revised its curriculum to meet the minimum requirements of the 2002 Basic Education Curriculum (BEC) and go even beyond the minimum requirements. The schools follows the separate subject teaching mode as provided by the BEC. The curriculum is also designed to achieve the school's vision-mission which is college preparatory, wholistic formation of students and academic excellence.

Patron saint
The university's patron saint is St. John Baptist de La Salle, a French priest, educational reformer, and founder of international educational movement who spent over forty years of his life dedicated to education for the children of the poor. In the process, he standardized educational practices throughout France, wrote inspirational meditations on the ministry of teaching (along with catechisms, politeness texts, and other resources for teachers and students), and became the catalyst and resource for many other religious congregations dedicated to education that were founded in the 18th and 19th centuries.

IS Mikel Lovina Sportsfest

The Sportsfest is named as Mikel Lovina in honor of the late Mikel Lovina who was an athlete of the school. The school has 5 houses which are: The House of Ruhland, The House of Cody, The House of Murray, The House of Wester and The House of Masson. The name of the houses are derived from the first brothers of the school.

Since there are four levels in Junior High, Four different houses will compete to be called as the champion while one house will rest for the mean time. Rotation of colors will happen. Each batch in Junior High is called as one house.

Mikel Lovina Sportsfest 2019
Overall Champion : House of Ruhland (Grade 10)
Overall 1st Runner Up: House of Cody (Grade 9)
Cheering Competition Champion: House of Ruhland (Grade 10)
Cheering Competition 1st Runner Up: House of Wester (Grade 7)
Drumbeating Champion: House of Ruhland (Grade 10)Back to Back Champions

Mikel Lovina Sportsfest 2018
Overall Champion : House of Masson (Grade 10)
Overall 1st Runner Up: House of Ruhland (Grade 9)
Cheering Competition Champion: House of Masson (Grade 10)
Cheering Competition 1st Runner Up: House of Ruhland (Grade 9)
Best in Drumbeating: House of Ruhland (Grade 9)

Mikel Lovina Sportsfest 2017
Overall Champion : House of Masson (Grade 9)
Overall 1st Runner Up: House of Wester (Grade 10)
Cheering Competition Champion: House of Masson (Grade 9)
Cheering Competition 1st Runner Up: House of Wester (Grade 10)
Best in Drumbeating: House of Masson (Grade 9)

Student publications
The school provides opportunities for student writers to improve their craft through practice, interaction, and instructions in journalism and creative writing. It also provides advice to student writers on matters concerning campus press operations and management, encourages students to get involved in the publications and develops a pool of talents who are able to serve in the school papers.

Official Publications of Integrated School
 Crossroads - Upper Grades English Publication
 Ang Layag - Upper Grades Filipino Publication
 Green Beacon - Lower Grades English Publication
 Ang Luntiang Tanglaw - Lower Grades Filipino Publication

The Community Services Center

The Community Services Center serves as a venue for the students to be exposed to the reality of daily living in welfare institutions, public schools, urban squatter areas and puroks, and in the process, elicit in them the desire to fulfill the need for creative and meaningful involvement so as to meet some of the social needs of the marginalized communities.

The underlying thrust of the program is the inculcation of Christian values and moral principles which propel each individual to be more conscious of the needs of his fellowmen and contribute one's talents and wealth for the upliftment of the quality of life in the community.

It provides the students with concrete and meaningful opportunities to relate school experiences to one's immediate community, applying the theories gained from the different subjects taught in school. Here are different organizations under the Community Services Center.

 Kabulig Organization
 Young Christians for Environmental Rescue (YCER)
 Gawad Kalinga
 Abyan
 Lasallian Youth for Peace Corps (LSYPC)
 Bahay Pag-asa 
 IS Senior Red Cross Youth Council
 Drug Watch
 Kasanagan Youth
 Junior Amity Youth

Notable alumni
 Rafael M Alunan III — former Secretary of the Interior and Local Government 
Francis Arnaiz- former basketball player for Barangay Ginebra San Miguel and Toyota Super Corollas in the Philippine Basketball Association
Jeffrei Chan - professional basketball player for Rain or Shine Elasto Painters in the Philippine Basketball Association
Rafael Coscoluella - former governor of Negros Occidental
Bro. Rolando Ramos Dizon, FSC – De La Salle Brother, chairman of the Commission on Higher Education (Philippines)
 Daniel Lacson Jr. -former governor of Negros Occidental, former Government Service Insurance System Chairman, former President of Negros Navigation
Carlo Piccio - Olympic swimmer
Monico Puentevella - former Mayor of Bacolod, former congressman representing Bacolod, former commissioner of the Philippine Sports Commission
Joel Torre – film and television actor
Monsour del Rosario - taekwondo champion, film and TV actor, congressman representing the first district of Makati
Christian Vasquez - model, film and television actor
Jose Maria Zubiri Jr. - Governor of the Province of Bukidnon, former congressman representing the third district of Bukidnon

Notes and references

University of Saint La Salle
Catholic elementary schools in the Philippines
Catholic secondary schools in the Philippines
University-affiliated schools in the Philippines
University of Saint La Salle
Educational institutions established in 1952
1952 establishments in the Philippines